Adrien Thélin (11 October 1842 – 4 May 1922) was a Swiss politician and President of the Swiss National Council (1898/1899) and Council of States (1908/1909).

External links 
 
 

1842 births
1922 deaths
Members of the Council of States (Switzerland)
Presidents of the Council of States (Switzerland)
Presidents of the National Council (Switzerland)
Free Democratic Party of Switzerland politicians